Gene Eliza Tierney (November 19, 1920 – November 6, 1991) was an American film and stage actress. Acclaimed for her great beauty, she became established as a leading lady. Tierney was best known for her portrayal of the title character in the film Laura (1944), and was nominated for an Academy Award for Best Actress for her performance as Ellen Berent Harland in Leave Her to Heaven (1945).

Tierney's other roles include Martha Strable Van Cleve in Heaven Can Wait (1943), Isabel Bradley Maturin in The Razor's Edge (1946), Lucy Muir in The Ghost and Mrs. Muir (1947), Ann Sutton in Whirlpool (1949), Mary Bristol in Night and the City (1950), Maggie Carleton McNulty in The Mating Season (1950), and Anne Scott in The Left Hand of God (1955).

Early life
Gene Eliza Tierney was born on November 19, 1920, in Brooklyn, New York, the daughter of Howard Sherwood Tierney and Belle Lavinia Taylor. She was named after a beloved uncle, who died young. She had an elder brother, Howard Sherwood "Butch" Tierney Jr., and a younger sister, Patricia "Pat" Tierney. Their father was a successful insurance broker of Irish descent on his paternal side; their mother was a former physical education instructor.

Tierney was raised in Westport, Connecticut. She attended St. Margaret's School in Waterbury, Connecticut, and the Unquowa School in Fairfield. She published her first poem, "Night", in the school magazine and wrote poetry occasionally throughout her life. Tierney played Jo in a student production of Little Women, based on the novel by Louisa May Alcott.

Tierney spent two years in Europe, attending Brillantmont International School in Lausanne, Switzerland, where she learned to speak fluent French. She returned to the US in 1936 and attended Miss Porter's School in Farmington, Connecticut. On a family trip to the West Coast, she visited Warner Bros. studios, where her mother's cousin – Gordon Hollingshead – worked as a producer of historical short films. Director Anatole Litvak, taken by the 17-year-old's beauty, told Tierney that she should become an actress. Warner Bros. wanted to sign her to a contract, but her parents advised against it because of the relatively low salary; they also wanted her to take her position in society.

Tierney's society debut occurred on September 24, 1938, when she was 17 years old. Soon bored with society life, she decided to pursue an acting career. Her father said, "If Gene is to be an actress, it should be in the legitimate theatre." Tierney studied acting at a small Greenwich Village acting studio in New York with Yiddish and Broadway actor/director Benno Schneider. She became a protégée of Broadway producer-director George Abbott.

Career

Broadway
In Tierney's first role on Broadway, she carried a bucket of water across the stage in What a Life! (1938). A Variety magazine critic declared, "Miss Tierney is certainly the most beautiful water carrier I've ever seen!" She also worked as an understudy in The Primrose Path (1938).

The following year, she appeared in the role of Molly O'Day in the Broadway production Mrs. O'Brien Entertains (1939).  New York Times critic Brooks Atkinson wrote, "As an Irish maiden fresh from the old country, Gene Tierney in her first stage performance is very pretty and refreshingly modest." That same year, Tierney appeared as Peggy Carr in Ring Two (1939) to favorable reviews. Theater critic Richard Watts Jr.  of the New York Herald Tribune wrote, "I see no reason why Miss Tierney should not have an interesting theatrical career – that is, if cinema does not kidnap her away."

Tierney's father set up a corporation, Belle-Tier, to fund and promote her acting career. Columbia Pictures signed her to a six-month contract in 1939. She met Howard Hughes, who tried unsuccessfully to seduce her. From a well-to-do family herself, she was not impressed by his wealth. Hughes eventually became a lifelong friend.

After a cameraman advised Tierney to lose a little weight, she wrote to Harper's Bazaar magazine for a diet, which she followed for the next 25 years. Tierney was initially offered the lead role in National Velvet, but production was delayed. When Columbia Pictures failed to find Tierney a project, she returned to Broadway and starred as Patricia Stanley to critical and commercial success in The Male Animal (1940). In The New York Times, Brooks Atkinson wrote, "Tierney blazes with animation in the best performance she has yet given". She was the toast of Broadway before her 20th birthday. The Male Animal was a hit, and Tierney was featured in Life. She was also photographed by Harper's Bazaar, Vogue, and Collier's Weekly.

Two weeks after The Male Animal opened, Darryl F. Zanuck, the head of 20th Century Fox, was  rumored to have been in the audience. During the performance, he told an assistant to note Tierney's name. Later that night, Zanuck dropped by the Stork Club, where he saw a young lady on the dance floor. He told his assistant, "Forget the girl from the play. See if you can sign that one." She was Tierney. At first, Zanuck did not think she was the actress he had seen. Tierney was quoted (after the fact), saying: "I always had several different 'looks', a quality that proved useful in my career."

Film career

Tierney signed with 20th Century-Fox and her motion picture debut was in a supporting role as Eleanor Stone in Fritz Lang's Western The Return of Frank James (1940), opposite Henry Fonda.

A small role as Barbara Hall followed in Hudson's Bay (1941) with Paul Muni and she co-starred as Ellie Mae Lester in John Ford's comedy Tobacco Road (also 1941), and played the title role in Belle Starr alongside co-star Randolph Scott, Zia in Sundown, and Victoria Charteris (Poppy Smith) in The Shanghai Gesture. She played Eve in Son of Fury: The Story of Benjamin Blake (1942), as well as the dual role of Susan Miller (Linda Worthington) in Rouben Mamoulian's screwball comedy Rings on Her Fingers, and roles as Kay Saunders in Thunder Birds, and Miss Young in China Girl (all 1942). 

Receiving top billing in Ernst Lubitsch's comedy Heaven Can Wait (1943), as Martha Strable Van Cleve, signaled an upward turn in Tierney's career. Tierney recalled during the production of Heaven Can Wait:

Lubitsch was a tyrant on the set, the most demanding of directors. After one scene, which took from noon until five to get, I was almost in tears from listening to Lubitsch shout at me. The next day I sought him out, looked him in the eye, and said, 'Mr. Lubitsch, I'm willing to do my best but I just can't go on working on this picture if you're going to keep shouting at me.' 'I'm paid to shout at you', he bellowed. 'Yes', I said, 'and I'm paid to take it –  but not enough.' After a tense pause, Lubitsch broke out laughing. From then on we got along famously.

Tierney starred in what became her best-remembered role: the title role in Otto Preminger's film noir Laura (1944), opposite Dana Andrews (who she'd work with again in The Iron Curtain and Preminger's Where The Sidewalk Ends). After playing Tina Tomasino in A Bell for Adano (1945), she played the jealous, narcissistic femme fatale Ellen Berent Harland in Leave Her to Heaven (1945), adapted from a best-selling novel by Ben Ames Williams. Appearing with Cornel Wilde, Tierney won an Academy Award nomination for Best Actress. This was 20th Century-Fox's most successful film of the 1940s. It was cited by director Martin Scorsese as one of his favorite films of all time, and he assessed Tierney as one of the most underrated actresses of the Golden Era.

Tierney then starred as Miranda Wells in Dragonwyck (1946), along with Walter Huston and Vincent Price. It was Joseph L. Mankiewicz' debut film as a director. In the same period, she starred as Isabel Bradley, opposite Tyrone Power, in The Razor's Edge (also 1946), an adaptation of W. Somerset Maugham's novel of the same name. Her performance was critically praised.

Tierney played Lucy Muir in Mankiewicz's The Ghost and Mrs. Muir (1947), opposite Rex Harrison. The following year, she co-starred again with Power, this time as Sara Farley in the successful screwball comedy That Wonderful Urge (1948). As the decade came to a close, Tierney reunited with Laura director Preminger to star as Ann Sutton in the classic film noir Whirlpool (1950), co-starring Richard Conte and José Ferrer. She appeared in two other films noir: Jules Dassin's Night and the City, shot in London, and Otto Preminger's Where the Sidewalk Ends (both 1950), reunited with both Preminger and leading man Dana Andrews, with whom she appeared in five movies total including The Iron Curtain and, before Laura, Belle Starr and Tobacco Road. 

Tierney was lent to Paramount Pictures, giving a comic turn as Maggie Carleton in Mitchell Leisen's ensemble farce, The Mating Season (1951), with John Lund, Thelma Ritter, and Miriam Hopkins. She gave a tender performance as Midge Sheridan in the Warner Bros. film, Close to My Heart (1951), with Ray Milland. The film is about a couple trying to adopt a child. Later in her career, she was reunited with Milland in Daughter of the Mind (1969).

After Tierney appeared opposite Rory Calhoun as Teresa in Way of a Gaucho (1952), her contract at 20th Century-Fox expired. That same year, she starred as Dorothy Bradford in Plymouth Adventure, opposite Spencer Tracy at MGM.  Tracy and she had a brief affair during this time. Tierney played Marya Lamarkina opposite Clark Gable in Never Let Me Go (1953), filmed in England.

In the course of the 1940s, she reached a pinnacle of fame as a beautiful leading lady, on a par with "fellow sirens Rita Hayworth, Lana Turner and Ava Gardner". She was "called the most beautiful woman in movie history" and many of her movies in the 1940s became classic films.

Tierney remained in Europe to play Kay Barlow in United Artists' Personal Affair (1953). While in Europe, she began a romance with Prince Aly Khan, but their marriage plans met with fierce opposition from his father Aga Khan III. Early in 1953, Tierney returned to the U.S. to co-star in the film noir Black Widow (1954) as Iris Denver, with Ginger Rogers and Van Heflin.

Health
Tierney had reportedly started smoking after a screening of her first movie to lower her voice, because she felt that she sounded "like an angry Minnie Mouse." She subsequently became a heavy smoker.

Tierney struggled for years with episodes of manic depression. In 1943, she gave birth to a daughter, Daria, who was deaf and mentally disabled (possibly the result of a rubella infection she may have contracted from a fan).  In 1953, she suffered problems with concentration, which affected her film appearances. She dropped out of Mogambo and was replaced by Grace Kelly. While playing Anne Scott in The Left Hand of God (1955), opposite Humphrey Bogart, Tierney became ill. Bogart's sister Frances (known as Pat) had suffered from mental illness, so he showed Tierney great sympathy, feeding her lines during the production and encouraging her to seek help.

Tierney consulted a psychiatrist and was admitted to Harkness Pavilion in New York. Later, she went to the Institute of Living in Hartford, Connecticut. After some 27 shock treatments, intended to alleviate severe depression, Tierney fled the facility, but was caught and returned. She later became an outspoken opponent of shock treatment therapy, claiming it had destroyed significant portions of her memory.

In late December 1957, Tierney, from her mother's apartment in Manhattan, stepped onto a ledge 14 stories above ground and remained for about 20 minutes in what was considered a suicide attempt. Police were called, and afterwards, Tierney's family arranged for her to be admitted to the Menninger Clinic in Topeka, Kansas. The following year, after treatment for depression, she was discharged. Afterwards, she worked as a sales girl in a local dress shop with hopes of integrating back into society, but she was recognized by a customer, resulting in sensational newspaper headlines.

Later in 1958, 20th Century Fox offered Tierney a lead role in Holiday for Lovers (1959), but the stress upon her proved too great, so only days into production, she dropped out of the film and returned to Menninger for a time.

Comeback
Tierney made a screen comeback in Advise and Consent (1962), co-starring with Franchot Tone and reuniting with director Otto Preminger. Soon afterwards, she played Albertine Prine in Toys in the Attic (1963), based on the play by Lillian Hellman. This was followed by the international production of Las cuatro noches de la luna llena, (Four Nights of the Full Moon – 1963), in which she starred with Dan Dailey. She received critical praise overall for her performances.

Tierney's career as a solid character actress seemed to be back on track as she played Jane Barton in The Pleasure Seekers (1964), but then she suddenly retired. She returned to star in the television movie Daughter of the Mind (1969) with Don Murray and Ray Milland. Her final performance was in the TV miniseries Scruples (1980).

Personal life
Tierney was married twice. Her first husband was Oleg Cassini, a costume and fashion designer, on June 1, 1941, with whom she eloped. She was 20 years old. Her parents opposed the marriage because he was from a Russian-Italian family and born in France. She had two daughters, Antoinette Daria Cassini (October 15, 1943 – September 11, 2010) and Christina "Tina" Cassini (November 19, 1948 – March 31, 2015).

In June 1943, while pregnant with Daria, Tierney contracted rubella (German measles), likely from a fan ill with the disease. Antoinette Daria Cassini was born prematurely in Washington, DC, weighing  and requiring a total blood transfusion. The rubella caused congenital damage: Daria was deaf, partially blind with cataracts, and severely mentally disabled. She was institutionalized for much of her life. This entire incident was inspiration for a plot point in the 1962 Agatha Christie novel The Mirror Crack'd from Side to Side (Christie's official website says about that novel, "The plot was inspired by Agatha Christie's reflections on a mother's feelings for a child born with disabilities and there can be little doubt that Christie was influenced by the real-life tragedy of American actress Gene Tierney."). Tierney's friend Howard Hughes paid for Daria's medical expenses, ensuring the girl received the best care. Tierney never forgot his acts of kindness.  Daria Cassini died in 2010, at the age of 66.

Tierney and Cassini separated October 20, 1946, and entered into a property settlement agreement on November 10. Periodicals during this period record Tierney with Charles K. Feldman, including articles related to her "twosoming" with Feldman, her "current best beau". Her divorce from Cassini was to be finalized in March 1948, but they reconciled before then. They later divorced in 1952.

During their separation, Tierney met John F. Kennedy, a young World War II veteran, who was visiting the set of Dragonwyck in 1946. They began a romance that she ended the following year after Kennedy told her he could never marry her because of his political ambitions. In 1960, Tierney sent Kennedy a note of congratulations on his victory in the presidential election. During this time, newspapers documented Tierney's other romantic relationships, including Kirk Douglas.

While filming for Personal Affair in Europe, she began a romance with Prince Aly Khan. They became engaged in 1952, while Khan was going through a divorce from Rita Hayworth. Their marriage plans, however, met with fierce opposition from his father, Aga Khan III.

Cassini later bequeathed $500,000 in trust to Daria and $1,000,000 to Christina. Cassini and Tierney remained friends until her death in November 1991.

In 1958, Tierney met Texas oil baron W. Howard Lee, who had been married to actress Hedy Lamarr since 1953. Lee and Lamarr divorced in 1960 after a long battle over alimony. Lee and Tierney married in Aspen, Colorado, on July 11, 1960. They lived quietly in Houston, Texas, and Delray Beach, Florida until his death in 1981.

Despite her self-imposed exile in Texas, Tierney received work offers from Hollywood, prompting her to a comeback. She appeared in a November 1960 broadcast of General Electric Theater, during which time she discovered that she was pregnant. Shortly after, 20th Century Fox announced Tierney would play the lead role in Return to Peyton Place, but she withdrew from the production after suffering a miscarriage.

As a lifelong Republican, she supported Richard Nixon and Ronald Reagan in their elections.

Later years
Tierney's autobiography, Self-Portrait, in which she candidly discusses her life, career, and mental illness, was published in 1979.

In 1986, Tierney was honored alongside actor Gregory Peck with the first Donostia Lifetime Achievement Award at the San Sebastian Film Festival in Spain.

Tierney has a star on the Hollywood Walk of Fame at 6125 Hollywood Boulevard.

Death
Tierney died of emphysema on November 6, 1991, in Houston, 13 days before her 71st birthday. She is interred in Glenwood Cemetery in Houston.

Certain documents of Tierney's film-related material, personal papers, letters, etc., are held in the Wesleyan University Cinema Archives, though her papers are closed to the public.

Broadway credits

Filmography

Television credits

Radio appearances

Quotes

By Tierney
 "I don't think Howard [Hughes] could love anything that did not have a motor in it."
 "Joe Schenck, a top 20th Century-Fox executive, once said to me that he really believed I had a future, and that was because I was the only girl who could survive so many bad pictures." —quoted in The RKO Girls

Cultural references
 Tierney was ranked number 71 in Premiere Magazines list of "The 100 Sexiest Movie Stars of All Time".
 A comedy routine between Dean Martin and Jerry Lewis involved Lewis (in boxing shorts and gear) stating that he's fighting Gene Tierney. This plays on the similarly named Gene Tunney, who held the world heavyweight boxing title from 1926 to 1928.
 In a third-season episode of M*A*S*H* ("House Arrest"), the characters watch Tierney in Leave Her to Heaven. After Cornel Wilde kisses Tierney passionately, Hawkeye Pierce says, "If he straightens out that overbite, I'll kill him."
 Tierney was featured as the heroine of a novel, Gene Tierney and the Invisible Wedding Gift (1947), written by Kathryn Heisenfelt.
 Agatha Christie is widely assumed to have drawn the basic idea for her 1962 novel The Mirror Crack'd from Side to Side from the real-life German measles tragedy of Tierney and her baby.
The Off-Broadway Musical Violet references Gene Tierney several times. The main character Violet states that she wants a pair of "Gene Tierney eyes" due to the fact that her face was disfigured after an accident involving her father.
 Tierney is routinely discussed in the 2005 Irish novel An Evening of Long Goodbyes by Paul Murray

See also

References

Bibliography

External links

 
 
 
 
 
 Gene Tierney at The Biography Channel
 Gene Tierney at aenigma
 Photos of Gene Tierney in 'The Shanghai Gesture' by Ned Scott

1920 births
1991 deaths
20th Century Studios contract players
20th-century American actresses
20th-century American memoirists
Actresses from New York City
American Academy of Dramatic Arts alumni
American film actresses
American people of Irish descent
American radio actresses
American stage actresses
American television actresses
American women memoirists
Burials at Glenwood Cemetery (Houston, Texas)
Deaths from emphysema
Miss Porter's School alumni
New York (state) Republicans
People from Brooklyn
People with bipolar disorder
Texas Republicans